Himalaya with Michael Palin is a 2004 BBC television series  presented by comedian and travel presenter Michael Palin. It records his six-month trip around the Himalaya mountain range area. The trip covered only 4,800 km (3,000 miles) horizontally, but involved a lot of vertical travelling, including several treks into the mountains. The highest point attained by Palin was Everest Base Camp at 5,300 metres (17,500 feet).

A book by the same name written by Palin was published to accompany the series. This book contained both Palin's text and many pictures by Basil Pao, the stills photographer on the team. Basil Pao also produced a separate book of the photographs he took during the journey, Inside Himalaya, a large coffee-table style book printed on glossy paper.

Episode guide
The series is divided up into six one-hour episodes

Reviews
In The Guardian, Sam Wollaston praised Palin's quiet presenting and gentle mocking presenting style.

References

External links
 
 Palin's Travels – the official website

BBC television documentaries
2000s British travel television series
Adventure travel
Films set in the Himalayas
Television shows filmed in Bangladesh
Television shows filmed in Bhutan
Television shows filmed in China
Television shows filmed in India
Television shows filmed in Nepal
Television shows filmed in Pakistan
2000s British documentary television series
2004 British television series debuts
2004 British television series endings
Works by Michael Palin
BBC travel television series